Gudžiūnai Eldership is a Lithuanian eldership, located in the northern part of Kėdainiai District Municipality.  

Eldership was created from the Gudžiūnai selsovet in 1993.

Geography
All the territory is in the Central Lithuanian plain. There is the highest point (113 m) of the Kėdainiai District Municipality in Gudžiūnai Eldership. 
 Rivers: Dotnuvėlė, Liaudė, Nykis;
 Lakes and ponds: Mantviliškis pond;
 Forests: Gudžiūnai forest, Sosiai forest;
 Protected areas: Paberžė landscape sanctuary;
 Nature monuments: Nykis elm tree.

Populated places 
Following settlements are located in the Gudžiūnai Eldership (as for 2011 census):

Towns: Gudžiūnai
Villages: Alksnėnai · Antanava · Antušava · Balsiai · Danilava · Devynduoniai · Draustiniai · Gasčiūnai · Graužiai · Gudžiūnai · Jaunakaimis · Jokūbaičiai · Margininkai · Marimpolis · Miegėnai · Mlodzinava · Paberžė · Padruskalnys · Pamiškės · Pasiekai · Pilėnai · Senkaimis · Senkoniai · Terespolis · Trakupiai · Tremtiniai · Vikaičiai · Vypalai · Žilvičiai
Hamlets: Alksnupiai  
Railway settlements: Gudžiūnai GS

References

Elderships in Kėdainiai District Municipality